Kumail Ali Nanjiani (born May 2, 1978) is a Pakistani-American actor, stand-up comedian, and screenwriter. He is known for his role as Dinesh in the HBO comedy series Silicon Valley (2014–2019) and for co-writing and starring in the romantic comedy film The Big Sick (2017). For co-writing the latter with his wife, Emily V. Gordon, he was nominated for the Academy Award for Best Original Screenplay. In 2018, Time magazine named him one of the 100 most influential people in the world.

Nanjiani has also voiced Prismo on the animated series Adventure Time and starred in the TNT series Franklin & Bash and the Adult Swim series Newsreaders. He also co-hosted the Comedy Central show The Meltdown with Jonah and Kumail, as well as playing various roles on the comedy series Portlandia. He also starred as Kingo in the Marvel Studios superhero film Eternals (2021), which is set in the Marvel Cinematic Universe (MCU), starred as street-level con artist Haja Estree in the Disney+ miniseries Obi-Wan Kenobi, and played celebrity scientist Vik in the television series The Boys Presents: Diabolical and The Boys. In 2022 he starred in the lead role of the Hulu miniseries Welcome to Chippendales.

Early life
Nanjiani grew up in Karachi, the first of two sons of Shiite Muslim couple Shabana and Aijaz Nanjiani. The BBC radio presenter Shereen Nanjiani is his second cousin. During his childhood, he lived in Karachi and attended St. Michael's Convent School for his O-Levels and graduated from Karachi Grammar School to complete his A-Levels, where he was the class-fellow of Sharmeen Obaid Chinoy. At 18, he moved to the U.S. and enrolled at Grinnell College in Grinnell, Iowa, where he graduated in 2001 with a double major in computer science and philosophy. He then moved to Chicago and began performing stand-up comedy at open-mic events.

Career
In 2007, Nanjiani wrote and staged an original autobiographical one-man show in Chicago, New York, and Los Angeles. After moving to New York, he continued to perform stand-up and made occasional appearances on shows including Michael & Michael Have Issues and The Colbert Report. In 2009, he performed at the Just for Laughs comedy festival. In 2011, Nanjiani and X-Play staffer Ali Baker began hosting a video game-themed podcast, titled The Indoor Kids. In late August the same year, Baker left the show and Nanjiani began hosting with his wife, Emily V. Gordon. Until other commitments took over, he appeared regularly on Dan Harmon's podcast Harmontown, where he played Dungeons & Dragons with Harmon as a character named Chris de Burgh. He played a delivery man in the 2013 film The Kings of Summer. In addition to guest-starring in comedy shows like Portlandia, Nanjiani was featured in a supporting role in the TNT series Franklin & Bash. He played the role of Pindar Singh, an agoraphobic fiction nerd working for the title characters.

Nanjiani guest-starred on HBO's Veep as a statistician. He had the recurring roles of Amir Larussa on Newsreaders and Prismo on Adventure Time. His Comedy Central special Beta Male aired in July 2013. In late June 2013, Comedy Central announced the pickup of The Meltdown with Jonah and Kumail, hosted by Jonah Ray and Nanjiani. The show, featuring Nerd Melt comedy regulars and various comedians, began airing in July 2014. In April 2014, he began playing the character Dinesh in the HBO sitcom Silicon Valley. He voiced Reggie in the video game The Walking Dead: Season Two. In July 2014, Nanjiani hosted a weekly podcast titled The X-Files Files, dedicated to discussion and reminiscences about The X-Files. Each episode features Nanjiani and a guest, including former The X-Files writers, producers, actors and directors, in light-hearted banter about one or two episodes of the series. On July 30, 2014, Nanjiani appeared on Ken Reid's TV Guidance Counselor Podcast.

In 2015, Nanjiani guest-starred in the Broad City episode "In Heat". Starting on March 22, 2015, he provided his voice for the character of Mshak Moradi in the Hunt the Truth audio drama, part of the marketing campaign for Halo 5: Guardians. On May 5, 2015, he appeared on the Inside Amy Schumer episode "12 Angry Men Inside Amy Schumer", a parody of 12 Angry Men, as one of the jurors. In July 2015, Nanjiani provided guest voices on Aqua Teen Hunger Force and Penn Zero: Part-Time Hero.

In 2017, Nanjiani starred in the romantic comedy film The Big Sick, which he wrote with Gordon. The film is about their relationship, with Nanjiani playing himself and Zoe Kazan playing Gordon (renamed Emily Gardner). The film was one of the most acclaimed of 2017, and was chosen by American Film Institute as one of the top 10 films of the year and nominated for the Academy Award for Best Original Screenplay. The film was also the third-highest-grossing independent film released in 2017, grossing over $40 million.

In 2018, he was invited to the actors and writers branch of the Academy of Motion Picture Arts and Sciences.

In 2019, Nanjiani headlined the first episode of the CBS All Access revival of the anthology series The Twilight Zone. For his role on The Twilight Zone, Nanjiani received a nomination for the Primetime Emmy Award for Outstanding Guest Actor in a Drama Series. In film, Nanjiani voiced the alien Pawny in Men in Black International, which was released on June 14. Nanjiani stated, "I play an alien so you won't see my face but you'll hear my voice, I'm a little alien frog/lizard... thing." Nanjiani also stars in the action comedy film Stuber, released on July 12. In 2020, Nanjiani lent his voice to Plimpton, an ostrich, in the adventure comedy film Dolittle. He also wrote for and produced the Apple TV+ anthology series Little America, which premiered in January 2020. The series is based on the story collection of the same name from Epic Magazine which focuses on stories from immigrants. To promote the series, Nanjiani appeared at the Apple Event of March 25, 2019. Nanjiani starred with Issa Rae in the comedy-chase film The Lovebirds, directed by Michael Showalter, produced by Paramount Pictures, and released by Netflix in May 2020.

In March 2020, during the COVID-19 pandemic, Nanjiani and his wife Emily Gordon launched a podcast, Staying In with Emily and Kumail. The series chronicles their experiences as a couple forced to live in isolation during the global pandemic. The podcast has been widely acclaimed in the media, as a welcome respite during a period of high anxiety. GQ described it as "consistently endearing, actually useful, and often hilarious." New York magazine relates that "all advice is shared via cute and charming banter."

He starred in the Marvel Cinematic Universe film Eternals, as Kingo, which was released on November 5, 2021. Nanjiani received widespread attention and went viral after sharing pictures of his body transformation for the shooting of Eternals in 2019. Speaking with GQ, he noted how he has since become less comfortable to speak about his body due to the intense amount of attention it received online. In March 2021, Nanjiani was announced as cast in an upcoming Obi-Wan Kenobi series for Disney+. In February 2020, Nanjiani signed on to star in The Independent, a political thriller to be directed by Amy Rice, though he ultimately dropped out of the role.

In 2022, Nanjiani starred in the Hulu miniseries Welcome to Chippendales in the lead role of Somen Banerjee, founder of the Chippendales dance troupe.

Personal life
In 2007, Nanjiani married author, producer, and former couples and family therapist Emily V. Gordon at Chicago City Hall. She was the producer of The Meltdown with Jonah and Kumail (2014–2016).

Despite being a devout Muslim for most of his life, Nanjiani now identifies as an atheist. Nanjiani is an avid video gamer.

Filmography

Film

Television

Video games

Web

Awards and nominations

References

External links

 
 
 
 "Fresh Air" interview with Kumail Nanjiani (December 2022)

1970s births
Living people

Comedians from Karachi
Comedians from New York (state)
Grinnell College alumni
Karachi Grammar School alumni
Male actors from Karachi
Male actors from New York (state)
Pakistani emigrants to the United States
Pakistani former Shia Muslims
American film actors of Pakistani descent
Pakistani male television actors
Pakistani podcasters
Pakistani stand-up comedians
Pakistani atheists
Former Muslims turned agnostics or atheists
People from Karachi
People from New York (state)
21st-century American comedians
Independent Spirit Award winners
American comedians of Asian descent
People with acquired American citizenship
Age controversies
Khoja Ismailism
Sindhi people